Uncle Jim may refer to:

James Remsen (1811–1887), an American landowner and developer
James Turner (fictional character), a character from the Swallows and Amazons book series
"Uncle Jim", a song by Black 47 from their 2004 album Elvis Murphy's Green Suede Shoes
"Uncle Jim", a work of art by Philip Fishbourne Wharton
Uncle Jim Trail, a hiking trail in Grand Canyon National Park
Uncle Jim's Question Bee, an American radio quiz program
"Uncle Jim and Tad and Tim" (or "Uncle Jim and Tim"), a comic strip by Clare Victor Dwiggins
Wong Jim (1941–2004), a Cantopop lyricist and writer